Giovanni Ambrogio Bicuti (1607–1675) was a Roman Catholic prelate who served as Bishop of Acqui (1647–1675).

Biography
Giovanni Ambrogio Bicuti was born in Acqui, Italy on 7 Dec 1607.
On 27 May 1647, he was appointed during the papacy of Pope Innocent X as Bishop of Acqui.
On 2 Jun 1647, he was consecrated bishop by Pier Luigi Carafa, Cardinal-Priest of Santi Silvestro e Martino ai Monti, with Ranuccio Scotti Douglas, Bishop of Borgo San Donnino, and Alessandro Vittrici, Bishop of Alatri, serving as co-consecrators. 
He served as Bishop of Acqui until his death on 10 Mar 1675.

References 

17th-century Italian Roman Catholic bishops
Bishops appointed by Pope Innocent X
1607 births
1675 deaths